The Augusta Apartment Building, along with the Louisa Apartment Building, are historic structures located in the Northwest Quadrant of Washington, D.C.  Washington architect Arthur B. Heaton designed both buildings, which were built a year apart from one another in 1900 and 1901.  They are two of his earliest commissions.  The Tudor Revival façade of the buildings emulate the mansions that were built during the late Victorian age.  The exterior features Flemish bond and tapestry brick with decorative motifs in both tile and limestone.  It was listed on the National Register of Historic Places in 1994.

References

Residential buildings completed in 1900
Apartment buildings in Washington, D.C.
Tudor Revival architecture in Washington, D.C.
Residential buildings on the National Register of Historic Places in Washington, D.C.